The 2021 Russian election protests, also known as the "For Fair Elections" protests, began in September 2021 due to alleged large-scale electoral fraud of the 2021 Russian legislative election.

Chronology 
On the night of September 20, the day after the end of the 2021 Russian legislative election, Valery Rashkin, the head of the Moscow City Committee of the Communist Party of the Russian Federation (CPRF), organized a protest against fraud in the format of a meeting with a deputy. At least 200 people took part in the action, including the losing opposition candidates Mikhail Lobanov, Denis Parfenov, Sergei Obukhov, Mikhail Tarantsov, and Marina Litvinovich; the latter also made slogans in support of Alexey Navalny, who is in prison. Rashkin promised that street actions would take place every week until the results of remote electronic voting are canceled.

On 25 September, protests continued in Moscow, Saratov, Yekaterinburg, Ufa, Volgograd, and other cities of the country. The day before the rally, the police cordoned off the building of the Moscow City Committee of the CPRF, and detained a number of communists, including the coordinator of the Left Front Sergei Udaltsov. The police used propaganda machines against the protesters, trying to drown out the speakers' speeches with loud music.

CPRF leader Gennady Zyuganov did not come to the protest, as he was meeting with Russian president Vladimir Putin at that time, Meduza's sources in the Presidential Administration and the CPRF claim that he raised the issue of canceling the results of remote electronic voting in Moscow to Anton Vaino, Sergey Kiriyenko, and Sergey Sobyanin, but they made it clear that no one would do this, after which Zyuganov is trying to achieve a more favorable distribution of leadership positions for the CPRF in the new convocation of the State Duma.

On 28 September, the police came to the lawyers of the CPRF who were going to file lawsuits appealing the results of the DEG. The Kremlin said it was not aware of this.

The police also blocked the reception of the State Duma deputy from the CPRF Ivan Melnikov, who called these actions a criminal offense and said that he had filed an appeal to the head of the Ministry of Internal Affairs Kolokoltsev.

On 29 September, in protest against the results of the DEG and repressions against the participants of the protests, the Moscow City Duma deputies from the CPRF decided to boycott the session.

Reaction 
Leonid Volkov, an associate of the opposition leader Alexei Navalny, said that thanks to the protests the CPRF returned the status of an opposition party. At a meeting with Putin, far-right LDPR leader Vladimir Zhirinovsky condemned the protests, calling them a "riot".

Aftermath 
Dozens of protesters were brought to administrative responsibility and arrested.

References

2021 protests
2021 in Moscow
2021 in Russian politics
Protests in Russia
September 2021 events in Russia
October 2021 events in Russia
Protests against results of elections
Protests
Communist Party of the Russian Federation